Louis James Piccone (born July 17, 1949) is a former American football wide receiver and kick returner who played nine seasons in the National Football League for the New York Jets and Buffalo Bills.  He played college football at West Liberty State College.

Piccone caught 100 passes for 1,380 yards and six touchdowns in nine years in the NFL.

Piccone led the NFL with 39 kickoff returns and 961 kickoff return yards as a rookie with the Jets in 1974.  He again led the NFL with 31 kickoff returns in 1976.  He also finished 5th in the league that season with 699 kickoff return yards.

References

1949 births
Living people
People from Vineland, New Jersey
American football wide receivers
New York Jets players
Buffalo Bills players
West Liberty Hilltoppers football players